Arkansas Highway 236 (AR 236 and Hwy. 236) is an east–west state highway in Lonoke County. The route of  connects Highway 89 and Highway 13 including a concurrency with Highway 31.

Route description

The route begins at Highway 89 north of Furlow. Highway 236 runs due east through Fairview to form a concurrency north with Highway 31. The route breaks from Highway 31 and runs due east to meet Highway 13, where it terminates.

Major intersections

See also

 List of state highways in Arkansas

References

External links

236
Transportation in Lonoke County, Arkansas